Vladilen Ivanovich Mashkovtsev (1929–1997) was a Russian poet, writer and journalist. He wrote 15 books published in the Urals and in Moscow.

Bibliography

Novels 

 Zolotoy tsvetok — odolen / Gold Flower Odolen
 Vremya krasnogo drakona / The Red Dragon's Time

Poems 

 Litsom k ognyu / With Face To Fire
 Razdum'ye г mavzoleya / Thoughts At The Mausoleum

Poetical cycles 

 Alye lebedi / Red Swans
 Kazatskie gusli / Kazak's Gusli
 Krasnoye smescheniye / Red Shift
 Lyubov' trevozhnaya / Worried Love
 Magnitka — sud'ba moya / Magnitka, My Destiny
 Molodost' / Youth
 Oranzhevaya magiya / Orange Magic
 Protivorechiya serdtsa / Heart's Contradictions
 Samotsvety / Gems
 Chudo v kovshe / Magic In The Scoop

External links 
 Vladilen Mashkovtsev's works at the Maksim Moshkow's Library

Russian male poets
Russian male novelists
People from Magnitogorsk
1929 births
1997 deaths
20th-century Russian novelists
20th-century Russian poets
20th-century Russian male writers
20th-century Russian journalists
Maxim Gorky Literature Institute alumni